

Filmfare Awards
The Filmfare Awards are one of the oldest Hindi film awards. They are presented annually by The Times Group for excellence of cinematic achievements. Manish received one award.

Filmfare Awards (South)

Filmfare Style Awards

Bollywood Movie Awards

IIFA Awards

Samsung Wizcraft IIFA Awards

Zee Cine Awards

Other awards
 Showtime Opinion Poll Award for Raja Hindustani 
 Rok Glam Award Zoom for Contemporary Wear Design - Women in 2007 
 Siemen's Viewer's Choice Award for Dil To Pagal Hai
 Stylish Designer Of the Year at the Elle Style Awards in 1999
 Indo American Society Award for contribution to Fashion Designing
 Indira Priyadarshini Memorial Award for his contribution to the fashion industry
 Manish was Felicitated by National Institute Of Fashion Technology
 Indian Affairs of Network 7 Media Group felicitated Manish at India Leadership Conclave 2013 as "Fashion Icon of the Decade 2013".

References

Lists of awards received by fashion designer